Oblepikha is a rural locality (a village) in Posyolok Anopino, Gus-Khrustalny District, Vladimir Oblast, Russia. The population was 89 as of 2010. There are 2 streets.

Geography 
The village is located 58 km SSE from Vladimir, 7.5 km north-east from Gus-Khrustalny.

References 

Rural localities in Gus-Khrustalny District